Permanent Observer Mission of the Organisation of Islamic Cooperation to the European Union
() is the official representative office of the Organization of Islamic Cooperation (OIC) in Brussels, Belgium. 
The OIC opened its Mission in Brussels in order to contribute and reinforce cooperation and relationship with the European Union (EU) in April 2012, which was followed by the official inauguration by former Secretary General H.E. Mr. Ekmeleddin İhsanoğlu on 25 June 2013.

H.E. Ambassador Mrs. Ismat Jahan, Bangladeshi diplomat, is the Head of the Mission. She began her functions on 1 September 2016.

The opening of OIC Mission to the EU is seen as a new phase in OIC-EU relations. OIC aims at strengthening the relations with the European Union and work jointly on a number of political issues including, among all, combating terrorism, conflict prevention and post-conflict peacebuilding, combating islamophobia and providing cultural and informational exchange between the OIC Member States and EU as well as promoting interreligious and intercultural dialogue, human rights and humanitarian assistance.

References

Organisation of Islamic Cooperation
Organisation of Islamic Cooperation
Organisation of Islamic Cooperation
Organisation of Islamic Cooperation
Organisation of Islamic Cooperation